Michael Gruber may refer to:

 Michael Gruber (author) (born 1940), American novelist
 Michael Gruber (actor) (born 1964), American actor
 Michael Gruber (artist) (born 1965), German artist
 Michael Gruber (skier) (born 1979), Austrian Nordic Combined skier